Dylan Reinhart may refer to:

Dylan Denlon, a character in the Saw franchise
Dylan Reinhart (Shortland Street), a character in the New Zealand soap opera Shortland Street
Dylan Reinhart, a character in the 2018 TV series Instinct